Flagg is a surname. Notable people with the surname include:

 Abner S. Flagg (1851-1923), American politician
 Amy Flagg (1893-1965), British historian
 Ann Flagg (1924–1970), African-American playwright, stage actress and drama teacher
 Azariah C. Flagg, (1790–1873), American politician
 Edmund Flagg (1815–1890), American writer, lawyer, and diplomat
 Ella Flagg Young (1845–1918), American educator
 Ernest Flagg (1857–1947), American architect
 Fannie Flagg (born 1944), American author
 George Whiting Flagg (1816–1897), American painter
 Henry Collins Flagg (1792–1863), American lawyer, newspaper editor, and politician
 James Montgomery Flagg (1877–1960), American artist
 Jared Bradley Flagg (died 1899), American artist
 Norman G. Flagg (1867–1948), American politician
 Ray Dennis Steckler or Cash Flagg (1938–2009), American film director
 Russell de Gree Flagg (1892–1980), American luthier
 Willard Cutting Flagg (1867–1948), American politician
 Wilson Flagg (1938–2001), American admiral

Fictional characters:
 General Flagg, two characters in the G.I. Joe universe
 Harry Flagg, a character in the British soap opera Coronation Street
 Randall Flagg, a villain in several Stephen King novels
 Sam Flagg, a character in the TV series M*A*S*H
 Brick Flagg, a character in the animated series Kim Possible